This article provides details of unofficial international football games played by the Iraq national football team which are not regarded as official by FIFA and AFC.

Results

2000–2009

2010–2019

2020–2029

References 

Iraq national football team results
Lists of national association football team unofficial results